The Langley Events Centre is a  multipurpose facility in the Township of Langley, British Columbia, Canada. The LEC debuted in April 2009, hosting the 2009 BC Gymnastics Championships. It boasts an arena bowl with a 5,276 capacity for sports, including 24 individual suites. The LEC also showcases a triple Gymnasium with a capacity of 2,200 spectators under its centre court configuration. The venue's second building houses the Field House, a dry floor arena, as well as a double gymnasium with a capacity of 1,000 spectators.  Other highlights of the facility include a Banquet Hall with an 800-person capacity, an indoor walking track, meeting rooms, and the Willoughby Community Centre, while includes a fitness facility, outdoor playground and various grass and turf fields. The LEC is home to the Langley Gymnastics Foundation, a non-profit organization offering gymnastics programming for recreational and competitive athletes.

History
The Langley Events Centre, the largest sports and recreation project in Langley's history to date, opened its doors after more than two years of construction. Plans were unveiled on December 18, 2006, for what was then a $45 million multi-use facility. Costs ultimately rose to $56 million, partially funded by the Township, the province, and private builders. The first event hosted at the LEC was the 2009 BC Gymnastics Championships.

Teams

Vancouver Stealth 

The Washington Stealth of the National Lacrosse League relocated to the LEC on June 27, 2013 to become the Vancouver Stealth.  They are the second NLL team to play in Greater Vancouver, following the Vancouver Ravens from 2002 through 2004 at General Motors Place. The Stealth played in Langley from 2013 to 2018, until the team was purchased by Canucks Sports and Entertainment and moved to Rogers Arena in downtown Vancouver. In the following season, the team was rebranded to become the Vancouver Warriors.

Langley Rivermen 

The LEC was home to the Langley Rivermen of the British Columbia Hockey League. The team began play in 2011 after the Langley Chiefs returned to their original home, becoming the Chilliwack Chiefs. In 2016, the Rivermen relocated to the George Preston Recreation Centre, due to the WHL's Vancouver Giants moving from the Pacific Coliseum to the LEC.

Langley Thunder 

The LEC hosts three Langley Thunder lacrosse teams, the Langley Thunder Western Lacrosse Association team, the Langley Thunder BC Junior A Lacrosse League team, and the Langley Thunder Intermediate team.

Trinity Western University Athletics 

Five Trinity Western Spartans sports teams play at the Langley Events Centre: basketball (men's and women's), volleyball (men's and women's), and hockey (men's). The LEC replaced David E. Enarson Gymnasium as the home of the Spartans.

BC Titans 

The BC Titans of the International Basketball League (IBL) called the LEC home from 2009-2010. Team management opted not to participate in the IBL for the 2011 season.

Vancouver Giants 

The Vancouver Giants of the WHL have started play with the beginning of the 2016–2017 season at the Langley Events Centre.  They had previously played at the Pacific Coliseum.

Vancouver Bandits

On September 23, 2021 – The Fraser Valley Bandits announced that the club has chosen Langley Events Centre (LEC) as its home for the upcoming Canadian Elite Basketball League (CEBL) season, which begins May 2022.

Vancouver FC
On April 13, 2022, the Canadian Premier League and SixFive Sports and Entertainment LP announced that Vancouver FC would begin playing in Langley, British Columbia at the Willoughby Community Park adjacent to the Langley Events Centre.

Notable events 

2009 BC Artistic Gymnastics Provincial Championships
2010 Vancouver/Whistler Winter Olympics Torch Relay Community Celebration site
2010 Women’s Hockey Pre-Olympic exhibition game, Russia vs Slovakia
2010 Vancouver Giants of the Western Hockey League (WHL), 6 regular season home games
2011 NLL Pre-Season (Washington Stealth vs Toronto Rock)
2011 Mann Cup (Langley Thunder vs. Brampton Excelsiors)
2011 World Junior A Hockey Challenge
2012 World Curling Financial Group Continental Cup
2012 NLL Pre-Season (Calgary Roughnecks vs Colorado Mammoth)
2012 U23 Pan American Men's Volleyball Cup
2013 Special Olympics BC Provincial Summer Games Opening Ceremony
2013 NORCECA Men's Volleyball Continental Cup
2013 NLL Championship Game
2014 Vancouver Stealth Franchise Opener
2014 Minto Cup (Coquitlam Adanacs vs Six Nations Arrows)
Eight High School Basketball tournaments are played at the LEC each year, including the 4A Boys Basketball Championships
2018 LORDCO Road to the World Junior (Finland vs Denmark, USA vs Czech Republic) 
2019 BC Compulsory Women's Artistic Gymnastics Championships
2022 Canadian Ninja League National Finals
2022 World Under-17 Hockey Challenge
2022 CCAA Men's Soccer National Championship

Other notes
The LEC is home to a number of groups and organizations, including Tourism Langley and the Langley Sports Medicine Clinic.

References

External links
 

Langley, British Columbia (district municipality)
Western Hockey League arenas